The Gentle Touch is a British police procedural drama series made by London Weekend Television for ITV which began on 11 April 1980 and ran until 24 November 1984. The series is notable for being the first British series to feature a female police officer as its leading character, ahead of the similarly themed BBC series Juliet Bravo by four months.

Series history
The series starred Jill Gascoine as Detective Inspector Maggie Forbes, who has worked her way up through the ranks of the police force and is based at the fictional Seven Dials police station in London. Maggie's husband, a police constable, is murdered during the first episode, leaving her to juggle her career with single parenthood, raising her teenage son.

The Gentle Touch largely dealt with routine police procedures and offered a frank depiction of relevant social issues (including racism, sexism, homosexuality, mental health and euthanasia). It was relatively low on action and violence in comparison to previous classic crime series such as The Sweeney, opting for a more realistic and low key approach. Although the series mostly focused on Maggie's professional life in a male-dominated field, it also showed her home life with her elderly father George and her teenage son Steve. Occasionally, Maggie's romantic involvements were seen which sometimes clashed with her job. 

The Gentle Touch was a ratings success in the UK, where it was screened on Friday nights in a 9.00 p.m. slot (except for the final series which was shown on Saturday nights). One episode shown in January 1982 garnered over 18 million viewers and was the 5th most watched television programme in Britain that year. The Gentle Touch made Gascoine a household name, and ran for five series until 1984.

Spin-off
Gascoine returned as Maggie Forbes in the more action-oriented spin-off series C.A.T.S. Eyes (also created by Terence Feely), concerning a specialised team of female detectives in Kent who covertly work for the Home Office. C.A.T.S. Eyes lasted three series from 1985 to 1987.

Main cast
 Jill Gascoine as Detective Inspector Maggie Forbes
 William Marlowe as Detective Chief Inspector Bill Russell
 Brian Gwaspari as Detective Inspector Bob Croft (1980–1983)
 Derek Thompson as Detective Sergeant Jimmy Fenton (1980–1982)
 Paul Moriarty as Detective Sergeant Jake Barrett
 Nigel Rathbone as Steve Forbes
 Kevin O'Shea as Detective Sergeant Peter Phillips (1982–1984)
 Bernard Holley as Detective Inspector Mike Turnbull (1982–1984)
 James Ottaway as George Taylor
 Michael Graham Cox as Detective Inspector Jack Slater (1984)

Episode list

Home media
The complete series is available on DVD in the UK in five series sets from Network.

References

External links
British Film Institute Screen Online
 
 

1980 British television series debuts
1984 British television series endings
1980s British crime drama television series
1980s British police procedural television series
1980s British workplace drama television series
ITV television dramas
Television series by ITV Studios
London Weekend Television shows
English-language television shows
Television shows set in London
British detective television series